is a city located in Okhotsk Subprefecture, Hokkaido, Japan.

Abashiri is known as the site of the Abashiri Prison, a Meiji-era facility used for the incarceration of political prisoners. The old prison has been turned into a museum, but the city's new maximum-security prison is still in use.

As of 2008, the city has an estimated population of 40,333 and a density of 85.6 persons per km2 (222 persons per sq. mi.).

Etymology 
There are various theories about the origin of the name 'Abashiri' and, because of that, the origin is unknown. All of those theories are based on the Kanji interpretation of the Ainu language. These are the following theories.

 Apasiri (アパシリ) which is translated as "leaking ground". The reason behind this is that there was a cave, and water drops were falling inside like raindrops.
 Cipasiri (チパシリ). The name is based on an Ainu legend of a bird.
 Chipasiri  (チパシリ). There used to be a white rock in the shape of a person wearing a hat on the south bank of Lake Abashiri, and it is said that the Ainu worshiped it.

History 
The origin of the city's name is not known for certain, but it is agreed that it was derived from an Ainu word. A few among several of the candidates include apa-siri (leakage/ground) and ci-pa-sir ("the land we discovered").
March 1872:  founded, being given the name of Abashiri District in Kitami Province.
1875: The village name is rewritten in kanji .
1902: Abashiri Village, Kitami Town, Isani Village, and Nikuribake Village, all in Abashiri District, merged to form Abashiri Town.
1915: Notoro Village, Mokoto Village merged.
1921: Memanbetsu Village (later Memanbetsu Town, merged into Ōzora in 2006) split.
1931: Boundary with Memanbetsu Town modified.
February 11, 1947: Higashimokoto Village (merged into Ōzora in 2006) split. Abashiri Town becomes Abashiri City. All of the territories of Ōzora used to be a part of Abashiri.

Geography
Abashiri is located in the eastern part of Okhotsk Subprefecture, about 50 kilometers east of Kitami. There are no tall mountains, but there are many hills. The Abashiri River flows through the city and there are three lakes (Lake Abashiri, Lake Notoro and Lake Tōfutsu) in the city as well. These lakes and Mount Tento belong to Abashiri Quasi-National Park.

Climate
The climate is humid continental with warm summer (Köppen: Dfb) as much of Hokkaido, similar to the south coast of New England. Despite its reputation for extreme cold, Abashiri is not actually the coldest major town in Japan, being less cold in the winter than Obihiro and warmer in summer than Nemuro or Kushiro. Abashiri receives less precipitation than any other city in Japan because its location on the drift ice-affected Sea of Okhotsk, which, however, causes Abashiri to receive less sunshine than the northeast coast since winter snowfall is heavier and fog less confined to the summer months when the Oyashio Current is strongest. During the winter, when Lake Abashiri freezes over, fog becomes a common occurrence. Also, the harbor closes when it ices over.

Economy
Because of its short 130-day growing season, the crops in the region, such as oats, potatoes, and beans, are required to be hardy. Hay is also grown for local cows, horses, and sheep. The sea is an important part of the community as well as the economy, as fishing, oysters, and seaweed are important means of livelihood.

Transportation

Air
Memanbetsu Airport is located in nearby Ōzora.

Rail
Abashiri is an important local port city and railway terminal (Abashiri Station).
 JR Hokkaido Sekihoku Main Line: Yobito - Abashiri
 JR Hokkaido Senmō Main Line: Abashiri - Katsuradai - Masuura - Mokoto - Kitahama

Education

Universities
 Tokyo University of Agriculture, Okhotsk campus

High schools
 Hokkaido Abashiri Minamigaoka High School
 Hokkaido Abashiri Keiyo High School

Sister city
 Port Alberni, British Columbia, Canada - Each year many students participate in student exchange programs between the two cities.

Sights

Hokkaido has a brewery called Abashiri which sells a range of beers, including Bilk, a blend of beer and milk. Abashiri is also home to a flower garden with a wide range of flowers.

In the winter, tourists visit the city to watch the drift ice.

Museums
 Okhost Ryuhyo Museum

Culture

Mascot

She is a plankton who the ability to gain flight with her cape. Her job is to protect everyone from criminal activities (such as terrorism and corruption), outbreak of warfare, natural disasters, health crisis (such as disease outbreaks) or anything that pose a risk to everyone's lives. She usually rests with her "nipopo" (totem pole) helmet and loves ingredients produced from the city. Her birthday is November 22.

References

External links

 Official Website 
 Abashiri Prison Museum Official Website 
 Abashiri Tourist Information 

 
Cities in Hokkaido
Populated coastal places in Japan
Port settlements in Japan